Ger FitzGerald may refer to:

 Ger FitzGerald (musician) (born 1970), musician and music industry executive
 Ger FitzGerald (hurler) (born 1964), Irish hurling manager and player